Bargagli is a comune (municipality) in the Metropolitan City of Genoa in the Italian region Liguria, located about  northeast of Genoa in the Val di Lentro.

Bargagli borders the following municipalities: Davagna, Genoa, Lumarzo, and Sori.

Main sights
The pieve of Santa Maria Assunta, dating to 935, one of the most ancient in Liguria.

References

Cities and towns in Liguria